Philip Palmer is a British novelist and screenwriter. Originally from Port Talbot, Wales, he studied English at Jesus College, Oxford, matriculating in 1979.

Writing career
His first novel was Debatable Space, published in January 2008 by Orbit Books in the United Kingdom and the United States. Philip Palmer describes himself as "...a glamorous hyphenate. Writer-writer-toolazytogetaproperjob-writer."

Works

Radio Plays 
For BBC Radio 4:
 Gin and Rum, about ghosts, 30 June 2000
 Fallen, 23 January 2001  
 The Faerie Queene, a very free version of Spenser’s epic poem, in the outlet's Classic Serial, 30 September 2001 – 7 October 2001
 The King’s Coiner, about the older-age anti-counterfeiter Isaac Newton, amid the cut-throat nature of serious fraud at the time, 23 April 2002
 The Travels of Marco Polo, 18 February 2004
 Rubato, about music, 11 February 2005
 Blame, about industrial manslaughter, 12 August 2005
 Breaking Point, Day of the Dead, 10 August 2007
 The Art Of Deception, 22–26 June 2009
 The Art of Deception, Day of the Dead (series 2), 20–24 December 2010
 Bearing Witness, legal drama inside the International Criminal Tribunal for the former Yugoslavia in The Hague, 12 December 2012 
Speak, amid dystopian "Globish", a 1500-word version of English, a dangerous romance makes a case for how words – and even more, their paucity – can control, confine, leach emotion and trap minds, 18 June 2018

Novels 
 Debatable Space (2008)
 Red Claw (2009)
 Version 43 (2010)
 Hell Ship (2011)
 Artemis (2011)
 Hell on Earth (2017)

References

External links

 Official Philip Palmer Web site

 

English science fiction writers
Alumni of Jesus College, Oxford
Living people
1960 births
People from Port Talbot